Antonio Bertoletti, also known as Antoine Marc Augustin Bertoletti (August 28, 1775 – March 6, 1846) was a Milanese military officer who served the French Empire as a general of brigade, notably in the Peninsular War.

Military career

During the War of the Fifth Coalition, Bertoletti served in the Italian theater under the command of Eugène de Beauharnais, the Viceroy of Italy. At the outbreak of war, he led a brigade in Achille Fontanelli's Division. Later, Jean Rusca took command of the division, which missed the Battle of Piave River. Bertoletti led his brigade in an action at Klagenfurt on 8 June and at Papa, Hungary on 12 June, as well as the major Battle of Raab on 14 June. During the Battle of Wagram, his brigade defended Klagenfurt on Eugene's line of communications.

In June 1813, Bertoletti famously held the fortress of Tarragona with 1,600 soldiers against John Murray's 16,000-man British army. Realizing he could not hope to hold the outer walls with his small Franco-Italian garrison, he pulled back into the inner defenses and two outworks. Ultimately, Murray abandoned the siege and 18 heavy cannon when he heard that two French relief columns were due to arrive. When the British expedition sailed away, Bertoletti alertly called for help from the nearest French column, which soon marched into the fortress. At the news that French reinforcements were nearby, Murray gave up a second plan to capture Tarragona. After the Napoleonic Wars, Bertoletti served the Austrian crown as field marshal. He died in Vienna. The Arc de Triomphe bears the inscription BERTOLETTI on the 37th column.

References
 Bowden, Scotty & Tarbox, Charlie. Armies on the Danube 1809. Arlington, Texas: Empire Games Press, 1980.
 Glover, Michael. The Peninsular War 1807-1814. London: Penguin, 2001. 
 Smith, Digby. The Napoleonic Wars Data Book. London: Greenhill, 1998.

Footnotes

External links
 The Names of 660 persons inscribed on the Arc de Triomphe
 Bertoletti French Wikipedia

1775 births
1846 deaths
French generals
Austrian generals
Italian generals
Italian commanders of the Napoleonic Wars
Italian military personnel of the Napoleonic Wars
Military personnel from Milan
Names inscribed under the Arc de Triomphe